The Einstein–Hilbert action (also referred to as Hilbert action) in general relativity is the action that yields the Einstein field equations through the stationary-action principle. With the  metric signature, the gravitational part of the action is given as

If it converges, the integral is taken over the whole spacetime. If it does not converge,  is no longer well-defined, but a modified definition where one integrates over arbitrarily large, relatively compact domains, still yields the Einstein equation as the Euler–Lagrange equation of the Einstein–Hilbert action.

The action was first proposed by David Hilbert in 1915.

Discussion 
Deriving equations of motion from an action has several advantages. First, it allows for easy unification of general relativity with other classical field theories (such as Maxwell theory), which are also formulated in terms of an action. In the process, the derivation identifies a natural candidate for the source term coupling the metric to matter fields. Moreover, symmetries of the action allow for easy identification of conserved quantities through Noether's theorem.

In general relativity, the action is usually assumed to be a functional of the metric (and matter fields), and the connection is given by the Levi-Civita connection. The Palatini formulation of general relativity assumes the metric and connection to be independent, and varies with respect to both independently, which makes it possible to include fermionic matter fields with non-integer spin.

The Einstein equations in the presence of matter are given by adding the matter action to the Einstein–Hilbert action.

Derivation of Einstein field equations
Suppose that the full action of the theory is given by the Einstein–Hilbert term plus a term  describing any matter fields appearing in the theory.

The stationary-action principle then tells us that to recover a physical law, we must demand that the variation of this action with respect to the inverse metric be zero, yielding

.

Since this equation should hold for any variation , it implies that

is the equation of motion for the metric field. The right hand side of this equation is (by definition) proportional to the stress–energy tensor,

.

To calculate the left hand side of the equation we need the variations of the Ricci scalar  and the determinant of the metric. These can be obtained by standard textbook calculations such as the one given below, which is strongly based on the one given in Carroll (2004).

Variation of the Riemann tensor, the Ricci tensor, and the Ricci scalar
To calculate the variation of the Ricci scalar we calculate first the variation of the Riemann curvature tensor, and then the variation of the Ricci tensor. So, the Riemann curvature tensor is defined as 

.

Since the Riemann curvature depends only on the Levi-Civita connection , the variation of the Riemann tensor can be calculated as 

.

Now, since  is the difference of two connections, it is a tensor and we can thus calculate its covariant derivative, 

.

We can now observe that the expression for the variation of Riemann curvature tensor above is equal to the difference of two such terms, 

.

We may now obtain the variation of the Ricci curvature tensor simply by contracting two indices of the variation of the Riemann tensor, and get the Palatini identity:

.

The Ricci scalar is defined as

.

Therefore, its variation with respect to the inverse metric  is given by

The last term, 

 or 

and thus by Stokes' theorem only yields a boundary term when integrated. The boundary term is in general non-zero, because the integrand depends not only on  but also on its partial derivatives ; see the article Gibbons–Hawking–York boundary term for details. However when the variation of the metric  vanishes in a neighbourhood of the boundary or when there is no boundary, this term does not contribute to the variation of the action. And we thus obtain

at events not in the closure of the boundary.

Variation of the determinant
Jacobi's formula, the rule for differentiating a determinant, gives:

,

or one could transform to a coordinate system where  is diagonal and then apply the product rule to differentiate the product of factors on the main diagonal. Using this we get

In the last equality we used the fact that

which follows from the rule for differentiating the inverse of a matrix

.

Thus we conclude that

Equation of motion
Now that we have all the necessary variations at our disposal, we can insert and  into the equation of motion for the metric field to obtain 

which is the Einstein field equations, and

has been chosen such that the non-relativistic limit yields the usual form of Newton's gravity law, where  is the gravitational constant (see here for details).

Cosmological constant 
When a cosmological constant Λ is included in the Lagrangian, the action:

Taking variations with respect to the inverse metric:

Using the action principle: 

Combining this expression with the results obtained before:

We can obtain:

With , the expression becomes the field equations with a cosmological constant:

See also
Belinfante–Rosenfeld tensor
Brans–Dicke theory (in which the constant k is replaced by a scalar field).
Einstein–Cartan theory
f(R) gravity (in which the Ricci scalar is replaced by a function of the Ricci curvature)
Gibbons–Hawking–York boundary term
Kaluza–Klein theory
Komar superpotential
Palatini action
Teleparallelism
Tetradic Palatini action
Variational methods in general relativity
Vermeil's theorem

Notes

Bibliography
 
 
 
Hilbert, D. (1915)  Die Grundlagen der Physik (German original for free) (English translation for $25), Konigl. Gesell. d. Wiss. Göttingen, Nachr. Math.-Phys. Kl. 395-407

Christopher M. Hirata Lecture 33: Lagrangian formulation of GR (27 April 2012).

Variational formalism of general relativity
General relativity
Albert Einstein
Gravity
David Hilbert